The following is a list of New Zealand film makers.

International directors

Domestic directors

Producers
 Barbara Sumner Burstyn
 Winston Cowie
 Fran Walsh
 Charles Knight
 Larry Parr
 Philippa Campbell

Actors

New Zealand at the Academy Awards

New Zealand film makers have won a total of sixteen Oscars at the US Film Academy Awards from 41 nominations. Eleven wins were for work on the Lord of the Rings film trilogy. 
The first New Zealand nomination was in 1958 for Snows of Aorangi with New Zealand's first wins coming in 1994 for The Piano.
1994

Winners and Nominees

Special effects
Richard Taylor, who is the head of Weta Workshop, has won a notable number of awards for his work on the Lord of the Rings film trilogy and King Kong. Currently, he holds one of the largest Academy Award Collections.

Film Makers
New Zealand
Filmmakers